American rapper Krayzie Bone has released nine studio albums.

Albums

Studio albums

Underground albums
Leatha Face: Underground (Part 1) (2003)
Streets Most Wanted (2005)
Leatha Face Presents - Kneight Riduz - Tha Undaland (2006)

Collaboration albums
Thug Brothers 2 (with Young Noble) (2017)
New Waves (with Bizzy Bone) (2017)
Thug Brothers 3 (with Young Noble) (2017)

Compilation albums
Too Raw for Retail (2005)
Mellow, Smooth and Krayzie (2007)
Everybody Wants a Thug (2010)

Mixtapes

Extended plays
Quick Fix: Less Drama. More Music. (Level 1) (2013)
Nothing Left To Prove digital release

Singles

As lead artist

As featured artist

Guest appearances

Music videos
"Thug Mentality"
"Paper"
"Hard Time Hustlin'"
"Get'chu Twisted"
"Life! A Lesson to Learn"
"Hard to Let Go"
"Explosive"
"Stand the Pain"
"Cashin Out (Remix)"
"24/7 The Grinder"
"Get Down"
"Another Level"
"Apply The Pressure"
"Head Hunters"
"Cloudy"
"Keight Riduz - Here We Come (Live)"

Notes

References

Hip hop discographies
Discographies of American artists